Eda Özerkan (born March 11, 1984) is a Turkish actress. She is best known for her roles in Pars: Operation Cherry (2007) and Girdap (2008), as well as the TV series Aşk-ı Memnu.

Filmography

References

External links
 
 Eda Özerkan on SinemaTürk 

1984 births
People from Adana
Living people
Turkish television actresses
Turkish film actresses